Nowhere Road is the first solo album by ex-Savoy Brown vocalist Chris Youlden, released in 1973. The album featured a number of well-known session musicians including Chris Spedding, Ray Fenwick, Roy Babbington and ex-Fleetwood Mac guitarist Danny Kirwan.

A single was released in March 1973 to accompany the album: "Nowhere Road" / "Standing on the Corner".

Track listing
All songs written by Chris Youlden
"Nowhere Road" – 4:51
"One October Day" – 2:25
"Chink of Sanity" – 4:01
"Crying in the Road" – 3:38
"Mamma Don't You Talk So Loud" – 3:13
"Standing on the Corner" – 3:29
"In the Wood" – 4:14
"Wake Up Neighbour" – 2:39
"Street Sounds" – 4:31
"Time Will Tell" – 2:43
"Pick Up My Dogs" – 2:40

Personnel
Chris Youlden – vocals
Danny Kirwan – guitar
Chris Spedding – guitar
Ray Fenwick – guitar
Foggy Lyttle – acoustic guitar
Andy Silvester – bass guitar
Roy Babbington – bass guitar
Bruce Rowland – drums
Mike MacNaught – piano
Pete Wingfield – piano
Sue and Sunny – backing vocals
Technical
Produced by Barry Murray for Murray/Simmonds Productions Ltd.
Terry Evennett engineer
David Wedgbury - photography 

1973 debut albums
Deram Records albums